Ragnvald Sigurdsson (c. 750 – after 814) was a semi-legendary lord of Huseby, in Lista (modern Norway). 

He is best known for the marriage of his daughter, Gunnhild Ragnvaldsdatter, to Harald Granraude, king of Agder. Ragnvald also had a son, Olve Ragnvaldsson.  

Ragnvald is not mentioned in accounts of events after 814, when Harald Granraude was killed by Gudrød the Hunter. 

Haraldr Hárfagri ("Harald Fair-hair"; c. 850 – c. 932), who has usually been regarded as the first King of Norway, was a great-great-grandson of Ragnvald Sigurdsson, a great-grandson of Harald Granraude and a grandson of Gudrød the Hunter.

See also
Heimskringla

750s births
Year of death unknown
People from Vest-Agder